Mearion Shonie Bickhem III (born May 3, 1972), better known as Shonie Carter, is an American mixed martial artist. He is a former WEC Welterweight Champion, a UFC veteran, and a contestant on The Ultimate Fighter 4 reality show. He has also competed in Pancrase, Shooto, King of the Cage, M-1 Global, KSW, and Bellator. He is known for his flashy dress, colorful vocabulary, outlandish personality and use of the spinning backfist in competition.

Early life and martial arts background
Carter was born in Chicago, Illinois and served for six years in the United States Marine Corps before beginning his profession as a fighter. Carter attended Proviso East High School. He began his martial arts training in Wrestling at Triton College in River Grove, Illinois before transferring to Carson-Newman College in Tennessee where he began studying Judo and Jujutsu, under Dr. Stephen Terrell and Dr. Stephen Karr. He was also an All-American Wrestler and participated in the Olympic trials. After a semester of studying Judo, Carter enrolled in the Tennessee state championship in the White-Green, Brown, and Black Belt divisions. He won state titles in the White-Green and Brown divisions, and placed second in the Black Belt division. His instructor awarded him his Brown Belt after his performance. Carter later added Kung Fu and Karate to his repertoire.

In addition to his MMA career, he also holds a record of 57 wins and 5 losses as a professional kickboxer.

Career
Carter has fought in a wide variety of shows, both large and small. He has won at least ten belts in various organizations throughout his career. He began his career in 1997, fighting primarily in the Extreme Challenge promotion. Though he lost his debut fight to LaVerne Clark by knockout in just 9 seconds, he went on to rack up an 11-1-2 record before facing UFC welterweight champion Pat Miletich. He lost via a decision.

Carter began to make appearances in Pancrase and won his UFC debut at UFC 24 against Brad Gumm. He went on to win notable victories over Chris Lytle and Matt Serra. In 2003, he appeared in fledgling promotion World Extreme Cagefighting and became the WEC Welterweight Champion after defeating JT Taylor. He would lose his first title defense to Karo Parisyan. Other notable fights included a loss to future UFC title contender Jon Fitch, a victory over future UFC fighter Jess Liaudin, and a victory over Jason Black, who was undefeated in 22 fights prior to the bout.

The Ultimate Fighter 4
After losing to Nathan Quarry at UFC 53 by TKO, Carter's UFC record stood at a lukewarm 3–2. He applied as a contestant for the fourth season of The Ultimate Fighter a reality show on Spike. The season, subtitled "The Comeback", featured MMA veterans whose careers in the UFC could use a jumpstart. Carter joined Team Mojo and was picked to fight first against Team No Love's Rich Clementi.  Carter arrived to the show out of shape and struggled through his initial workout. With help from his cornerman Matt Serra, however, Carter won a two-round decision over Clementi. In the second round, Carter fought a rematch with Matt Serra. Much was made of Carter's come-from-behind KO by spinning backfist in their previous encounter.  Though Carter landed another spinning backfist, he lost the fight by decision.

Throughout the show, Carter earned notoriety and sparked irritation from his cast-mates with his habits, including his unusual style of dress and various artistic projects. He angered both teams by unilaterally deciding to train with Team No Love for a day. He also asked Clementi to corner him in his fight with Serra.  On the show, his MMA record showed that he had 198 professional fights.

Post-show career

After the completion of the show, Carter did not appear on the card of the season finale. He did, however, make an appearance a month later at UFC Fight Night: Sanchez vs. Riggs, losing to Marcus Davis by unanimous decision. Afterward, Carter continued to fight in smaller promotions. He won the Throwdown Middleweight Championship at Throwdown ETC – Showdown on February 20, 2009, via a split decision victory from George Lockhart. He lost 7 out of his last 9 fights.

Carter announced his first retirement in January 2013, with around 240 full contact karate, kickboxing and MMA bouts under his belt.

Carter came out of retirement in January 2014, when he faced Matt Dwyer for the BFL Welterweight Championship. Carter lost the fight by TKO (retirement).

Other activities
After finishing his stint on The Ultimate Fighter, Carter appeared on BET's similar program The Iron Ring as a coach for Lil Jon's team, Headbusters. While taping, Carter verbally sparred with Floyd Mayweather, the leader of another team, over a fight stoppage. Mayweather was condescending toward the sport of mixed martial arts throughout the show. Carter claims that he has gained more notoriety from members of the black community since his appearance on The Iron Ring than from his UFC and The Ultimate Fighter appearances.

On May 16, 2008, Carter served as an impromptu guest referee for a notorious bout at a Legends of Fighting event that resulted in a double-knockout. Eight seconds into the bout, newcomers Tyler Bryan and Shaun Parker landed simultaneous knockout punches. The video of the double-knockout, and Carter's subsequent reaction, has been viewed on YouTube over 1 million times. He spoke with C.M. Punk on making the jump to the professional wrestling ring.

Bare Knuckle Boxing
On April 22, 2017, Carter took part in a "bare knuckle" (in actuality fighters hands were wrapped) boxing event for Bare Knuckle Boxing in England at BKB 4. He faced undefeated Jimmy "Celtic Warrior" Sweeney, BKB's most popular and recognized fighter, in a Middleweight title fight. Carter lost a spirited bout by decision after five rounds, but took Sweeney the distance, the first fighter in BKB history to do so.
Shonie had his training camp for this bout with Lytes Out Podcast host Mike Davis.

Personal life
Carter is currently single and has three children: a daughter Sierra Rena, and sons Samearion Andreas, and Kavion Osiris. He resides in Chicago teaching at the Honbu Dojo Shidokan USA under the guidance of USA Shidokan Branch Chief Eddie Yoshimura. He is a bartender and bouncer at the Mexican restaurant Fiesta Cantina in the Wrigleyville neighborhood of Chicago, Illinois and a personal trainer at the LA Fitness Gym's Ravenswood location.

Championships and accomplishments

Amateur wrestling
National Junior College Athletic Association
NJCAA All-American
Collegiate World Team member

Judo
Tennessee State Judo Championships
Tennessee Middleweight Judo Championship (Two times)

Karate
Ireland Super Cup
Ireland Super Cup Welterweight Championship
Shidōkan German Cup
Shidōkan German Cup Championship
Shidōkan Mixed Fighting
SMF Welterweight Championship
Shidōkan Superfight
Shidōkan Superfight Middleweight Championship
United States Shidōkan Championships
USSC Lightweight Championship
USSC Middleweight Championship
USSC Light Middleweight Championship

Kickboxing
Illinois State Kickboxing
Illinois Light Heavyweight Championship
North Carolina State Kickboxing
North Carolina Middleweight Championship

Mixed martial arts
Extreme Challenge
EC Lightweight Championship
EC Lightweight Tournament Championship
Indiana Martial Arts Challenge
IMAC Welterweight Championship
International Fighting Championship
IFC Welterweight Superfight Championship
Iron Heart Crown
IHC Shooto North American Welterweight Championship
King of the Cage
KOTC Welterweight Superfight Championship
Throwdown
Throwdown Middleweight Championship
World Extreme Cagefighting
WEC Welterweight Championship
World Fighting Council
WFC Middleweight Championship

Submission grappling
North American Grappling Association
NAGA Midwest Super Heavyweight Championship
United States Pankration Championship
United States Pankration Championship

Other
Awards and accomplishments
U.S.A. Martial Arts Hall of Fame Induction (2008)
Lifetime Achievement Award, Combat Radio Broadcasting (2009)
Action Martial Arts Hall of Fame Induction (2010)
Master's Hall of Fame Induction (2011)

Kickboxing record

|-
|-  bgcolor="#FFBBBB"
| 2001-12-15 || Loss ||align=left| Cung Le || Strikeforce || San Jose, California, USA || Decision (unanimous) || 5 || 3:00
|-
! style=background:white colspan=9 |
|-
|-
| colspan=9 | Legend:

Mixed martial arts record

|-
| Loss
| align=center|  (1)
| Joe Riggs
| TKO (punches)
| ZPromotions: Fight Night Medicine Hat 4
| 
| align=center| 2
| align=center| 4:54
| Medicine Hat, Alberta, Canada
| 
|-
| Loss
| align=center| 51–31–7 (1)
| Johnny Parsons
| KO (punches)
| Golden Fights: Cage Wars 22
| 
| align=center| 1
| align=center| 0:34
| Grand Junction, Colorado, United States
|
|-
| Win
| align=center| 51–30–7 (1)
| Shannon Ritch
| TKO (injury)
| Super Brawl Showdown 1
| 
| align=center| 1
| align=center| 5:00
| Phoenix, Arizona, United States
|
|-
| Loss
| align=center| 50–30–7 (1)
| Matt Dwyer
| TKO (retirement)
| Battlefield Fight League 27
| 
| align=center| 3
| align=center| 5:00
| Richmond, British Columbia, Canada
|
|-
| Loss
| align=center| 50–29–7 (1)
| Josh Bryant
| TKO (punches)
| KOTC: Heavy Duty
| 
| align=center| 2
| align=center| 2:15
| Tulsa, Oklahoma, United States
| 
|-
| Loss
| align=center| 50–28–7 (1)
| Brandon Halsey
| Decision (unanimous)
| KOTC: Reckless Abandon
| 
| align=center| 3
| align=center| 5:00
| Highland, California, United States
| 
|-
| Win
| align=center| 50–27–7 (1)
| Landon Showalter
| Decision (unanimous)
| Rumble on the Ridge 20
| 
| align=center| 3
| align=center| 5:00
| Snoqualmie, Washington, United States
| 
|-
| Loss
| align=center| 49–27–7 (1)
| Rumen Dimitrov
| TKO (punches)
| BMMAF: Warriors 19
| 
| align=center| 2
| align=center| 2:48
| Sofia, Bulgaria
| 
|-
| Loss
| align=center| 49–26–7 (1)
| Jeremy Knafo
| Decision (unanimous)
| Israel FC: Genesis
| 
| align=center| 3
| align=center| 5:00
| Tel Aviv, Israel
| 
|-
| Loss
| align=center| 49–25–7 (1)
| Torrance Taylor
| Decision (unanimous)
| Bellator 25
| 
| align=center| 3
| align=center| 5:00
| Chicago, Illinois, United States
| 
|-
| Loss
| align=center| 49–24–7 (1)
| Rick Hawn
| TKO (head kick and punches)
| Triumph Fighter 3: Havoc
| 
| align=center| 2
| align=center| 4:08
| Milford, New Hampshire United States
| 
|-
| Loss
| align=center| 49–23–7 (1)
| Dylan Andrews
| Decision (unanimous)
| Cage Fighting Championship 13
| 
| align=center| 3
| align=center| 5:00
| Gold Coast, Queensland, Australia
| 
|-
| Loss
| align=center| 49–22–7 (1)
| Nabil Khatib
| Decision (split)
| W-1 MMA 4: Bad Blood
| 
| align=center| 3
| align=center| 5:00
| Montreal, Quebec, Canada
| 
|-
| Win
| align=center| 49–21–7 (1)
| Derek Smith
| Submission (front choke)
| CFX: Cage Fighting Xtreme
| 
| align=center| 1
| align=center| 2:32
| St. Cloud, Minnesota, United States
| 
|-
| Loss
| align=center| 48–21–7 (1)
| Anthony Macias
| Decision (unanimous)
| Freestyle Cage Fighting 37
| 
| align=center| 3
| align=center| 5:00
| Tulsa, Oklahoma, United States
| 
|-
| Loss
| align=center| 48–20–7 (1)
| Carlos Newton
| Decision (unanimous)
| W-1 MMA 4: High Voltage
| 
| align=center| 3
| align=center| 5:00
| Gatineau, Quebec, Canada
| 
|-
| Win
| align=center| 48–19–7 (1)
| Danny Abbadi
| KO (punches)
| Respect in the Cage 1: Expo & Fight
| 
| align=center| 1
| align=center| 4:23
| Pico Rivera, California, United States
| 
|-
| Loss
| align=center| 47–19–7 (1)
| Derrick Noble
| Decision (unanimous)
| VFC: A Night of Vengeance
| 
| align=center| 3
| align=center| 5:00
| Oranjestad, Aruba
| 
|-
| Win
| align=center| 47–18–7 (1)
| George Lockhart
| Decision (split)
| Throwdown ETC: Showdown
| 
| align=center| 3
| align=center| 5:00
| Salt Lake City, Utah, United States
| 
|-
| Win
| align=center| 46–18–7 (1)
| Ryan Scheeper
| Submission (kimura)
| ISCF: Bad Intentions
| 
| align=center| 1
| align=center| 2:08
| Wisconsin Dells, Wisconsin, United States
| 
|-
| Win
| align=center| 45–18–7 (1)
| Allan Hope
| Submission (armbar)
| CCF 3: Undisputed
| 
| align=center| 1
| align=center| 2:32
| Edmonton, Alberta, Canada
| 
|-
| Loss
| align=center| 44–18–7 (1)
| Matt Major
| Decision (unanimous)
| CCFC: Rumble in the Park
| 
| align=center| 3
| align=center| 5:00
| Fresno, California, United States
| 
|-
| Win
| align=center| 44–17–7 (1)
| Demi Deeds
| TKO
| PFC: Primetime Fighting Championships
| 
| align=center| 2
| align=center| 2:41
| Indiana, United States
| 
|-
| Win
| align=center| 43–17–7 (1)
| John Cronk
| Decision (unanimous)
| WFC: Armageddon
| 
| align=center| 3
| align=center| 5:00
| Denver, Colorado, United States
| 
|-
| Loss
| align=center| 42–17–7 (1)
| Brad Zazulak
| TKO (injury)
| MFC 14: High Rollers
| 
| align=center| 1
| align=center| 2:09
| Enoch, Alberta, Canada
| 
|-
| Win
| align=center| 42–16–7 (1)
| Chris Powers
| Decision (unanimous)
| ISCF: Fight 2 the Finish
| 
| align=center| 3
| align=center| 5:00
| Chicago, Illinois, United States
| 
|-
| Win
| align=center| 41–16–7 (1)
| Joshua Taibl
| TKO (submission to strikes)
| EC 83: Extreme Challenge 83
| 
| align=center| 2
| align=center| 3:20
| Riverside, Iowa, United States
| 
|-
| Win
| align=center| 40–16–7 (1)
| Kris Fleurstil
| TKO (punches)
| XFO 18: Xtreme Fighting
| 
| align=center| 1
| align=center| 4:05
| Wisconsin Dells, Wisconsin, United States
| 
|-
| Loss
| align=center| 39–16–7 (1)
| Marcus Davis
| Decision (unanimous)
| UFC Fight Night: Sanchez vs. Riggs
| 
| align=center| 3
| align=center| 5:00
| San Diego, California, United States
| 
|-
| Win
| align=center| 39–15–7 (1)
| Alex Carter
| Submission (rear-naked choke)
| IFC: Rumble on the River
| 
| align=center| 1
| align=center| 3:21
| Kearney, Nebraska, United States
| 
|-
| Win
| align=center| 38–15–7 (1)
| Jason Black
| TKO (arm injury)
| KOTC: Redemption on the River
| 
| align=center| 1
| align=center| 1:18
| Moline, Illinois, United States
| 
|-
| Loss
| align=center| 37–15–7 (1)
| Mike Pyle
| Submission (triangle choke)
| WEC 18: Unfinished Business
| 
| align=center| 1
| align=center| 2:06
| Lemoore, California, United States
| 
|-
| Loss
| align=center| 37–14–7 (1)
| Jonathan Goulet
| Submission (bulldog choke)
| TKO 23: Extreme
| 
| align=center| 1
| align=center| 3:05
| Victoriaville, Quebec, Canada
| 
|-
| Win
| align=center| 37–13–7 (1)
| Marcin Zontek
| Decision (unanimous)
| KSW IV: Konfrontacja
| 
| align=center| 2
| align=center| 5:00
| Warsaw, Poland
| 
|-
| Win
| align=center| 36–13–7 (1)
| Josh Haynes
| Decision (unanimous)
| IFC: Rock N' Rumble
| 
| align=center| 3
| align=center| 5:00
| Reno, Nevada, United States
| 
|-
| Win
| align=center| 35–13–7 (1)
| Jason MacDonald
| Decision (unanimous)
| TKO 21: Collision
| 
| align=center| 3
| align=center| 5:00
| Montreal, Quebec, Canada
| 
|-
| Loss
| align=center| 34–13–7 (1)
| Nate Quarry
| TKO (punches)
| UFC 53: Heavy Hitters
| 
| align=center| 1
| align=center| 2:37
| Atlantic City, New Jersey, United States
| 
|-
| Loss
| align=center| 34–12–7 (1)
| Jorge Oliveira
| Decision (unanimous)
|  WEC 13: Heavyweight Explosion
| 
| align=center| 3
| align=center| 5:00
| Lemoore, California, United States
| 
|-
| NC
| align=center| 34–11–7 (1)
| Buddy Clinton
| No Contest (confusion over fight length)
| KOTC 45: King of the Cage 45
| 
| align=center| 2
| align=center| 5:00
| Indiana, United States
| 
|-
| Win
| align=center| 34–11–7
| John Cronk
| TKO (doctor stoppage)
| KOTC 44: Revenge
| 
| align=center| 1
| align=center| 5:00
| San Jacinto, California, United States
| 
|-
| Win
| align=center| 33–11–7
| Jody Poff
| Submission (rear-naked choke)
| WEC 12
| 
| align=center| 1
| align=center| 3:48
| Lemoore, California, United States
| 
|-
| Loss
| align=center| 32–11–7
| Azred Telkusheev
| Decision (unanimous)
| M-1 MFC: Middleweight GP
| 
| align=center| 2
| align=center| 5:00
| St. Petersburg, Russia
| 
|-
| Win
| align=center| 32–10–7
| Jason Biswell
| TKO (elbows)
| WEC 11
| 
| align=center| 1
| align=center| 3:13
| Lemoore, California, United States
| 
|-
| Win
| align=center| 31–10–7
| Jess Liaudin
| Decision
| CW: Cage Wars
| 
| align=center| 3
| align=center| 5:00
| Belfast, Northern Ireland
| 
|-
| Loss
| align=center| 30–10–7
| Karo Parisyan
| Decision (unanimous)
| WEC 10
| 
| align=center| 3
| align=center| 5:00
| Lemoore, California, United States
| 
|-
| Win
| align=center| 30–9–7
| Gabe Garcia
| TKO (injury)
| WEC 9
| 
| align=center| 1
| align=center| 0:30
| Lemoore, California, United States
| 
|-
| Loss
| align=center| 29–9–7
| Jon Fitch
| TKO (submission to slam)
| Shooto USA: Warrior Spirit Evolution
| 
| align=center| 3
| align=center| 0:41
| Las Vegas, Nevada, United States
| 
|-
| Win
| align=center| 29–8–7
| JT Taylor
| Decision (unanimous)
|  WEC 8: Halloween Fury 2
| 
| align=center| 3
| align=center| 5:00
| Lemoore, California, United States
| 
|-
| Win
| align=center| 28–8–7
| Dax Bruce
| Submission (rear-naked choke)
| WEC 7: This Time It's Personal
| 
| align=center| 1
| align=center| 2:28
| Lemoore, California, United States
| 
|-
| Draw
| align=center| 27–8–7
| Kousei Kubota
| Draw
| Shidokan: New Combat Festival
| 
| align=center| 2
| align=center| 5:00
| Tokyo, Japan
| 
|-
| Loss
| align=center| 27–8–6
| Ronald Jhun
| Decision (unanimous)
| KOTC 23: Sin City
| 
| align=center| 5
| align=center| 5:00
| Las Vegas, Nevada, United States
| 
|-
| Win
| align=center| 27–7–6
| Peter Angerer
| Decision
| Shido: Fists of Fury 2
| 
| align=center| 3
| align=center| 5:00
| Germany
| 
|-
| Loss
| align=center| 26–7–6
| Jeremy Jackson
| Decision (unanimous)
| WEC 6: Return of a Legend
| 
| align=center| 3
| align=center| 5:00
| Lemoore, California, United States
| 
|-
| Win
| align=center| 26–6–6
| Seichi Ikemoto
| Decision (unanimous)
| Shooto: 3/18 in Korakuen Hall
| 
| align=center| 3
| align=center| 5:00
| Tokyo, Japan
| 
|-
| Win
| align=center| 25–6–6
| Fernando Vasconcelos
| TKO (corner stoppage)
| KOTC 21: Invasion
| 
| align=center| 2
| align=center| 5:00
| Albuquerque, New Mexico, United States
| 
|-
| Win
| align=center| 24–6–6
| Mike Nomikos
| Submission (neck crank)
| Shidokan: World Open 2002
| 
| align=center| 2
| align=center| N/A
| Chicago, Illinois, United States
| 
|-
| Draw
| align=center| 23–6–6
| Ronald Jhun
| Draw
| SB 27: SuperBrawl 27
| 
| align=center| 3
| align=center| 5:00
| Honolulu, Hawaii, United States
| 
|-
| Win
| align=center| 23–6–5
| Jay Buck
| Decision (split)
| IHC 5: Tribulation
| 
| align=center| 3
| align=center| 5:00
| Hammond, Indiana, United States
| 
|-
| Win
| align=center| 22–6–5
| Randy Velarde
| Submission (rear-naked choke)
| KOTC 16: Double Cross
| 
| align=center| 1
| align=center| 4:53
| San Jacinto, California, United States
| 
|-
| Win
| align=center| 21–6–5
| Kolo Koka
| Decision (unanimous)
| SB 25: SuperBrawl 25
| 
| align=center| 3
| align=center| 5:00
| Honolulu, Hawaii, United States
| 
|-
| Win
| align=center| 20–6–5
| Armin Eslami
| Decision
| Shido: Fists of Fury 1
| 
| align=center| 3
| align=center| 5:00
| Mossingen, Germany
| 
|-
| Loss
| align=center| 19–6–5
| Pat Miletich
| KO (head kick)
| UFC 32
| 
| align=center| 2
| align=center| 2:42
| East Rutherford, New Jersey, United States
| 
|-
| Win
| align=center| 19–5–5
| Matt Serra
| KO (spinning back fist)
| UFC 31
| 
| align=center| 3
| align=center| 4:51
| Atlantic City, New Jersey, United States
| 
|-
| Win
| align=center| 18–5–5
| Yuji Hoshino
| Decision (majority)
| Pancrase: Trans 7
| 
| align=center| 1
| align=center| 15:00
| Tokyo, Japan
| 
|-
| Loss
| align=center| 17–5–5
| Steve Berger
| Submission (rear-naked choke)
| RSF 1: Reality Submission Fighting 1
| 
| align=center| 1
| align=center| 2:41
| Belleville, Illinois, United States
| 
|-
| Win
| align=center| 17–4–5
| Joe Merit
| Decision (unanimous)
| RSF 1: Reality Submission Fighting 1
| 
| align=center| 1
| align=center| 18:00
| Belleville, Illinois, United States
| 
|-
| Loss
| align=center| 16–4–5
| Nate Marquardt
| Decision (unanimous)
| rowspan=2|Pancrase: 2000 Anniversary Show
| rowspan=2|
| align=center| 2
| align=center| 3:00
| rowspan=2|Yokohama, Japan
| 
|-
| Win
| align=center| 16–3–5
| Chris Lytle
| Decision (unanimous)
| align=center| 3
| align=center| 3:00
| 
|-
| Win
| align=center| 15–3–5
| Yoshinori Kawasaki
| Decision (unanimous)
| Pancrase: Trans 5
| 
| align=center| 1
| align=center| 10:00
| Tokyo, Japan
| 
|-
| Win
| align=center| 14–3–5
| Adrian Serrano
| Decision (unanimous)
| UFC 26
| 
| align=center| 2
| align=center| 5:00
| Cedar Rapids, Iowa, United States
| 
|-
| Draw
| align=center| 13–3–5
| Kiuma Kunioku
| Draw
| Pancrase: Trans 3
| 
| align=center| 2
| align=center| 3:00
| Yokohama, Japan
| 
|-
| Win
| align=center| 13–3–4
| Brad Gumm
| Decision (unanimous)
| UFC 24
| 
| align=center| 2
| align=center| 5:00
| Lake Charles, Louisiana, United States
| 
|-
| Win
| align=center| 12–3–4
| Kousei Kubota
| Decision (unanimous)
| Pancrase: Trans 1
| 
| align=center| 1
| align=center| 10:00
| Tokyo, Japan
| 
|-
| Draw
| align=center| 11–3–4
| Takafumi Ito
| Draw
| Pancrase: Breakthrough 10
| 
| align=center| 1
| align=center| 15:00
| Osaka, Japan
| 
|-
| Loss
| align=center| 11–3–3
| Steve Berger
| Decision (split)
| IHC 1: Ironheart Crown
| 
| align=center| 2
| align=center| 2:00
| Chicago, Illinois, United States
| 
|-
| Loss
| align=center| 11–2–3
| Sean Hughes
| Decision
| EC 27: Extreme Challenge 27
| 
| align=center| 1
| align=center| 20:00
| Davenport, Iowa, United States
| 
|-
| Draw
| align=center| 11–1–3
| Simon Posner
| Draw
| SB 12: SuperBrawl 12
| 
| align=center| 3
| align=center| 5:00
| Honolulu, Hawaii, United States
| 
|-
| Win
| align=center| 11–1–2
| Phil Johns
| Submission (knee injury)
| EC 23: Extreme Challenge 23
| 
| align=center| 1
| align=center| 2:59
| Indianapolis, Indiana, United States
| 
|-
| Win
| align=center| 10–1–2
| Keith Wisniewski
| KO (spinning back fist)
| IMAC 3: Indiana Martial Arts Challenge 3
| 
| align=center| 1
| align=center| 0:40
| Indiana, United States
| 
|-
| Win
| align=center| 9–1–2
| Robert Masko
| Decision
| EB 1: Extreme Brawl 1
| 
| align=center| N/A
| align=center| N/A
| Kenosha, Wisconsin, United States
| 
|-
| Draw
| align=center| 8–1–2
| Dave Menne
| Draw
| EC 20: Extreme Challenge 20
| 
| align=center| 1
| align=center| 20:00
| Davenport, Iowa, United States
| 
|-
| Win
| align=center| 8–1–1
| Carl Davis
| Submission (choke)
| Tropicana D'Cache Club Fights
| 
| align=center| N/A
| align=center| N/A
| Chicago, Illinois, United States
| 
|-
| Win
| align=center| 7–1–1
| Jesse Jones
| Submission (frustration)
| EC 16: Extreme Challenge 16
| 
| align=center| 1
| align=center| 9:05
| Council Bluffs, Iowa, United States
| 
|-
| Win
| align=center| 6–1–1
| James Clingerman
| Decision
| rowspan=2|IMAC 1: Indiana Martial Arts Challenge 1
| rowspan=2|
| align=center| 1
| align=center| 15:00
| rowspan=2|Laporte, Indiana, United States
| 
|-
| Win
| align=center| 5–1–1
| Sean Brockmole
| Submission (choke from side mount)
| align=center| 1
| align=center| 6:04
| 
|-
| Win
| align=center| 4–1–1
| Todd Taylor
| Submission (rear-naked choke)
| CF: Combat Fighting
| 
| align=center| N/A
| align=center| N/A
| Chicago, Illinois, United States
| 
|-
| Win
| align=center| 3–1–1
| Andy Sanders
| Submission (crucifix)
| rowspan=2|EC 5: Extreme Challenge 5
| rowspan=2|
| align=center| 1
| align=center| 3:24
| rowspan=2|Waterloo, Iowa, United States
| 
|-
| Win
| align=center| 2–1–1
| Dave Menne
| Decision (split)
| align=center| 1
| align=center| 15:00
|
|-
| Draw
| align=center| 1–1–1
| Daniel Vianna
| Draw
| CC 3: Chicago Challenge 3
| 
| align=center| N/A
| align=center| N/A
| Chicago, Illinois, United States
| 
|-
| Win
| align=center| 1–1
| Chad Cox
| KO
| EC 4: Extreme Challenge 4
| 
| align=center| 1
| align=center| 2:45
| Council Bluffs, Iowa, United States
| 
|-
| Loss
| align=center| 0–1
| Laverne Clark
| KO (punches)
| EC 3: Extreme Challenge 3
| 
| align=center| 1
| align=center| 0:09
| Davenport, Iowa, United States
|

Bare Knuckle Boxing record

|-
| Loss
| align=center| 0-1
| Jimmy Sweeney
| Decision (unanimous)
| BKB 5
| 
| align=center| 5
| align=center| 2:00
| ?, England, Great Britain
| 
|-

References

External links
 Official site
 

1972 births
Living people
American male mixed martial artists
African-American mixed martial artists
Mixed martial artists from Illinois
Welterweight mixed martial artists
Middleweight mixed martial artists
Light heavyweight mixed martial artists
Mixed martial artists utilizing collegiate wrestling
Mixed martial artists utilizing jujutsu
Mixed martial artists utilizing judo
Mixed martial artists utilizing sanshou
Mixed martial artists utilizing Shidōkan
Mixed martial artists utilizing boxing
Mixed martial artists utilizing pankration
Ultimate Fighting Championship male fighters
World Extreme Cagefighting champions
American male kickboxers
Kickboxers from Illinois
Light heavyweight kickboxers
American male sport wrestlers
African-American sport wrestlers
Amateur wrestlers
American male boxers
African-American boxers
Boxers from Chicago
Bare-knuckle boxers
American male judoka
American male karateka
American sanshou practitioners
American jujutsuka
20th-century African-American sportspeople
21st-century African-American sportspeople
United States Marines
African-American United States Navy personnel